Neville B. Bonney (born in 1939) is a South Australian native plant expert, ethnobotanist and published author. His most recent book was published in 2013 and focused on Australia's native peach, the quandong. Bonney is an advocate for the commercialisation of "useful" indigenous flora, including wattleseed and has promoted the production and development of markets for "bush foods" in Australia and beyond.

Bibliography

References 

1939 births
20th-century Australian botanists
Ethnobotanists
Living people
21st-century Australian botanists